Out of Order is the fourth studio album released by american thrash metal band Nuclear Assault in 1991. This was the last Nuclear Assault studio album (until Third World Genocide) to feature Danny Lilker.

"Ballroom Blitz" is a Sweet cover.

Track listing
All songs arranged by Glenn Evans and Nuclear Assault, except where noted

Personnel
Nuclear Assault
John Connelly – vocals, guitars
Anthony Bramante – guitars, lead vocals on tracks 7 and 11, backing vocals
Dan Lilker – bass, keyboards, guitar, lead vocals on track 9, backing vocals
Glenn Evans – drums, percussion, acoustic guitars, lead vocals on track 11, backing vocals, producer

Additional musicians
Casey McMackin – guitars, backing vocals
John Quinn – keyboards
Maggie Gray – whispers on track 11
Jim Welch – backing vocals

Production
Casey McMackin – producer, engineer
Jay Ryan, John Quinn – assistant engineers 
Eddy Schreyer – mastering

References

1991 albums
Nuclear Assault albums
I.R.S. Records albums